Cyathobasis is a genus of flowering plants belonging to the family Amaranthaceae.

Its native range is Turkey.

Species:
 Cyathobasis fruticulosa (Bunge) Aellen

References

Amaranthaceae
Amaranthaceae genera